The Formula 4 South East Asia Championship was a formula racing series run to FIA Formula 4 regulations. The inaugural season was held over 2016 and 2017 and the last one was held in 2019.

History
Gerhard Berger and the FIA Singleseater Commission launched Formula 4 in March 2013. The goal of the Formula 4 was to make the ladder to Formula 1 more transparent. Besides sporting and technical regulations, costs are also regulated. A car to compete in this category may not exceed €30,000 and a single season in Formula 4 may not exceed €100,000. South East Asian Formula 4 was the third series to start in 2016 and the eleventh Formula 4 category overall.

Car

The South East Asian Formula 4 car uses the Mygale monocoque and carbon fibre frame found in the Australian and the British championships and running Renault 1.6L engines similar to those used in the Danish and French series.

All cars are prepared by Malaysian team Meritus GP.

Champions

Drivers Champions

Rookie Cup

Circuits

Notes

References

External links
 

 
Formula racing series
Recurring sporting events established in 2016
Formula 4 series
Auto racing series in Malaysia